Nina Yargekov (born 21 July 1980) is a French-Hungarian novelist and translator.

Life and career
Yargekov was born in France to Hungarian parents. She studied Sociology and is a translator and interpreter.

Chloé Delaume had herself mentioned that she had followed Yargekov before the publication of her first novel, which she described as "an extremely unique voice. I followed her manuscript through all its different versions, and I am so happy that it will finally be published next winter through POL." In 2011, she published Vous serez mes témoins (You will be my witnesses), a novel about 'fake identity in mourning'.

Her novel  (Dual Nationality) - the story of an amnesiac woman who finds herself in an airport with two passports, two cultures, two languages - was awarded the Prix de Flore on the 8 November 2016.

Also a musician and singer, Yargekov has since 2018 been part of the industrial rock group KNS with Samantha Barendson and Karim Kattan.

Works

Novels
 Tuer Catherine (Kill Catherine), 2009
 Vous serez mes témoins (You will be my witnesses), éditions P.O.L, 2011
  (Dual Nationality), éditions P.O.L, 2016 - winner of the 2016 Prix de Flore

Collections
 L'autre Iseut (The Other Iseut), published in Et encore un livre (And Another Book), directed by Marie Darrieussecq, Centre Dramatique National d’Orléans, 2009
 Comme Erika (Like Erika), published in Mon corps est un champ de bataille (My Body is a Battlefield), Ma colère, 2009
 Panoplie argumentative (Argumentative Costume), published in Alim, directed by Émilie Notéris, IMHO, 2010
 Y comme Yourcenar (Y is for Yourcenar), published in Un livre peut en cacher un autre (One Book Can Hide Another), alphabet book illustrated by Christian Lacroix and sold in bookshops, 2014

Journals
Publications in the journals Cahier critique de poésie (Critical Notebook of Poetry - ), Korunk, Rouge-déclic, Raise magazine, TINA...

Notes and references

External links
 Official blog
 Nina Yargekov on the  website

21st-century French novelists
French women novelists
French people of Hungarian descent
1980 births
Living people